The Lefler-Woodman Building is a historic building in Salt Lake City, Utah. The building was first erected as the Lefler Flour Mill for John Marshall Lefler, an immigrant from Canada, and completed in 1878. It was later joined by the Woodman Building, built for John A. and Frank H. Woodman and completed in 1911. The structure was designed in the Late Victorian style by architect George S. Walker. It has been listed on the National Register of Historic Places since December 17, 1992.

References

National Register of Historic Places in Salt Lake City
Victorian architecture in Utah
Commercial buildings completed in 1878
1878 establishments in Utah Territory